Stay Awake is a collection of short stories by Dan Chaon, published in 2012 by Ballantine Books. It was a finalist for The Story Prize.

External links

2012 short story collections
Ballantine Books books